Clarina kotschyi, the grapevine hawkmoth, is a moth of the family Sphingidae. The species was first described by Vincenz Kollar in 1849. It is found from the Iranian plateau and Mesopotamia to eastern and central Turkey.

Adults rest by day amongst the dense foliage of its host plant, or on rocks on the ground. The habitat consists of hillsides up to 2,000 meters and mountain valleys with shrubs, vineyards and isolated trees. It can be very common in some grape-growing areas.

The wingspan is 60–80 mm. It is similar to Clarina syriaca (which is often treated as a subspecies of Clarina kotschyi), but much larger and the wings not obviously dentate. Adults are on wing from early May to late August in three overlapping generations.

The larvae have been recorded feeding on Vitis vinifera, Parthenocissus and Ampelopsis species.

References

Macroglossini
Moths of the Middle East
Insects of Turkey
Moths described in 1849
Taxa named by Vincenz Kollar